The name Virgil has been used for two tropical cyclones worldwide:

In the Eastern Pacific:
 Hurricane Virgil (1992) – a late-season category 4 hurricane which struck southwestern Mexico, causing minimal damage.  

In the Western Pacific:
 Typhoon Virgil (1999) (T9921, 19W) – never approached land. 

Pacific hurricane set index articles
Pacific typhoon set index articles